Glistening Pleasure is the debut album by Seattle-based rock band Natalie Portman's Shaved Head (now Brite Futures), released in the United States through Team Swam Records on July 15, 2008. The album was reissued, and remastered, in 2010 under the title Glistening Pleasure 2.0 under the name Brite Futures.

Track listing
 "Me + Yr Daughter" – 4:09
 "Slow Motion Tag Team" – 3:15
 "Iceage Babeland" – 4:42
 "Mouth Full of Bones" – 3:52
 "Holding Hands in the Shower" – 3:15
 "L.A. Noir" – 3:48
 "Staying Cool" – 3:39
 "Bedroom Costume" – 3:06
 "Hush Hush" – 3:18
 "Beard Lust" – 3:24
 "Sophisticated Side Ponytail" – 1:31
 "The Malibu Highlife" – 3:23
 "Confections" – 4:38

Personnel
Lance Abair – synthesizer, keyboards, producer, drum programming, synthesizer bass, guest appearance
William "Billy" Brown – assistant
Martin Feveyear – engineer, mixing
Steve Hall – mastering
Stefanie Moore – cover art
David Price – guitar, keyboards, vocals, clapping, group member
Martin Resch – guitar, guest appearance
Larry Smith – producer
Luke "Lukvatine" Smith – bass, guitar, percussion, keyboards, vocals, producer, clapping, drum programming, group member

References

2008 debut albums